Keelhauling (Dutch kielhalen; "to drag along the keel") is a form of punishment and potential execution once meted out to sailors at sea. The sailor was tied to a line looped beneath the vessel, thrown overboard on one side of the ship, and dragged under the ship's keel, either from one side of the ship to the other, or the length of the ship (from bow to stern).

The common supposition is that keelhauling amounted to a sentence of either death by extreme torture, or minimally a physical trauma likely to cause maim. The hull of the ship was usually covered in barnacles and other marine growth, and thus, keelhauling would typically result in serious lacerations, from which the victim could later suffer infection and scarring. If the victim was dragged slowly, their weight might lower them sufficiently to miss the barnacles, but this method would frequently result in their drowning. There was also a risk of head trauma from colliding against the hull or keel, especially if the ship was in motion.

History 

There is limited evidence that keelhauling in this form was used by pirate ships, especially in the ancient world. The earliest known mention of keelhauling is from the Greeks in the Rhodian Maritime Code (Lex Rhodia), of c. 700 BCE, which outlines punishment for piracy. There is an image on a Greek vase, for example, from the same era.

Several 17th-century English writers such as William Monson and Nathaniel Boteler recorded the use of keel-hauling on English naval ships. However, their references are vague and provide no date. There seems to be no record of it in English ships' logs of the era, and naval historian Nicholas Rodger has stated he knows of no firm evidence that it ever happened. In 1880, George Shaw Lefevre was confronted in Parliament with a recent report from Italy of a keelhauling on HMS Alexandra, and denied that such an incident had taken place.

Some historians believe keelhauling may have been introduced to the Dutch Navy by William of Orange. Perhaps the most graphic incident of it occurred in 1673 when Cornelis Evertsen the Youngest punished sailors who committed murder. It was an official, though rare, punishment in the Dutch navy, as shown in the painting The keel-hauling of the ship's surgeon of Admiral Jan van Nes. This shows a large crowd gathered to watch the event, as though it was a "show" punishment intended to frighten other potential offenders, as was flogging round the fleet. A contemporary description suggests it was not intended to be fatal:

Keel-Hauling, a punishment inflicted for various offences in the Dutch Navy. It is performed by plunging the delinquent repeatedly under the ship's bottom on one side, and hoisting him up on the other, after having passed under the keel. The blocks, or pullies, by which he is suspended, are fastened to the opposite extremities of the main-yard, and a weight of lead or iron is hung upon his legs to sink him to a competent depth. By this apparatus he is drawn close up to the yard-arm, and thence let fall suddenly into the sea, where, passing under the ship's bottom, he is hoisted up on the opposite side of the vessel. As this extraordinary sentence is executed with a serenity of temper peculiar to the Dutch, the culprit is allowed sufficient intervals to recover the sense of pain, of which indeed he is frequently deprived during the operation. In truth, a temporary insensibility to his sufferings ought by no means to be construed into a disrespect of his judges, when we consider that this punishment is supposed to have peculiar propriety in the depth of winter, whilst the flakes of ice are floating on the stream; and that it is continued till the culprit is almost suffocated for want of air, benumbed with the cold of water, or stunned with the blows his head received by striking the ship's bottom.

A footnote in one source suggests that it may have evolved from the medieval punishment of ducking.

The term still survives today, although usually in the sense of being severely rebuked.

In popular culture 
 In Treasure Island, by Robert Louis Stevenson, keelhauling is mentioned as the topic of discussion between Black Dog and Morgan when Jim first enters Silver's inn.
 In Season 4 Episode 3 of the Starz series Black Sails, at approximately the 41 minute mark a pirate is keelhauled as a means of execution.

See also
 Running the gauntlet
 Birching
 Caning
 Cat o' nine tails
 Hanging
 Walking the plank
 Operation Keelhaul

References 

 kielholen entry in: Johann Hinrich Röding: Allgemeines Wörterbuch der Marine in allen Europäischen Seesprachen nebst vollständigen Erklärungen. Nemnich, Hamburg & J.J. Gebauer, Halle, 1793–1798.

External links 
 An explanation of the terms "drawn and quartered" and "keelhauling" on The Straight Dope

Corporal punishments
Execution methods
Pirate customs and traditions